Pat Fidelia (born April 16, 1959 in Port-au-Prince) is a retired Haitian-American soccer forward who spent four seasons in the North American Soccer League, two in the American Soccer League and one in the United Soccer League.  He also earned one cap playing with/for the national team.

Youth
Fidelia was born in Haiti and moved to the United States as a child, settling in Mount Holly, New Jersey and graduating in 1976 from Rancocas Valley Regional High School. He then attended Mercer County Community College.

Playing

Professional
The Houston Hurricane of the North American Soccer League (NASL) drafted Fidelia with the last pick (96th overall) of the 1978 Draft.  It then traded him to the Philadelphia Fury.  While playing as a substitute for most of the 1978 season with the Fury, Fidelia led the team in scoring with eight goals.  The Fury folded at the end of the 1980 season and Fidelia moved to the Montreal Manic for the 1981 season.  In 1979, he signed with the Cleveland Force of the Major Indoor Soccer League, playing 29 games for the team during the 1979–1980 season.  In 1982, Fidelia left the NASL for the Carolina Lightnin' of the American Soccer League.  He scored eight goals that season.   The ASL folded following the 1983 season and the Lightnin' jumped to the United Soccer League, changing its name to the Charlotte Gold.  The Gold lasted only the 1984 season before folding.  Fidelia retired from playing professionally.

National team
Fidelia earned his one cap with the national team in a 3–1 win over Bermuda on October 7, 1979 when he came on for Greg Villa.

Amateur
Fidelia continued to play for amateur teams in the Charlotte Amateur Soccer League.  In the late 1980s he played for Fish Fare and was with Pepsi in 1990.

Coaching
After retiring from playing, Fidelia coached high school soccer at Charlotte Christian.  In April 1989, he resigned, but was hired by Christ School in Arden, NC.  He currently coaches at Carolina Day in Asheville, NC.

References

External links
 NASL/MISL stats

1959 births
American expatriate sportspeople in Canada
American expatriate soccer players
American soccer coaches
American Soccer League (1933–1983) players
American soccer players
Carolina Lightnin' players
Charlotte Gold players
Cleveland Force (original MISL) players
Expatriate soccer players in Canada
Association football forwards
American sportspeople of Haitian descent
Haitian emigrants to the United States
Major Indoor Soccer League (1978–1992) players
Mercer County Community College alumni
Montreal Manic players
North American Soccer League (1968–1984) players
People from Mount Holly, New Jersey
Philadelphia Fever (MISL) players
Philadelphia Fury (1978–1980) players
Rancocas Valley Regional High School alumni
Soccer players from New Jersey
Sportspeople from Burlington County, New Jersey
United Soccer League (1984–85) players
United States men's international soccer players
Living people
Sportspeople from Port-au-Prince